Odivelas is a civil parish in the municipality of Odivelas, Portugal. The population in 2011 was 59,546, in an area of 5.04 km².

References

Freguesias of Odivelas